Carlton Barracks is a military installation in Leeds in West Yorkshire, England.

History
The barracks were opened as a base for the 4th Battalion of the West Yorkshire Militia in 1865. In 1887 the barracks were bought, with corps funds, to accommodate the 3rd Battalion the Prince of Wales (West Yorkshire) Regiment (The Rifles). In 1908, the 3rd battalion became the 7th and 8th battalions; these new battalions were also based at Carlton Barracks.

At the start of the First World War so many men reported to Carlton Barracks in response to the call to arms that the War Office decided to form two second line battalions (2/7th and 2/8th, the original battalions becoming 1/7th and 1/8th).

After the Second World War the headquarters of 45th (Leeds Rifles) Royal Tank Regiment (TA) was established at the barracks as was the headquarters of 269 Field Regiment Royal Artillery. The former regiment evolved to become the 7th (Leeds Rifles) battalion of the West Yorkshire Regiment, based at Carlton Barracks, and the latter regiment evolved to become a battery now known as 269 (West Riding) Battery Royal Artillery which is still based at the barracks.

Other Army Reserve units based at the barracks now include 49 (West Riding) Signal Squadron and B Squadron 23 Special Air Service (R).

References

Installations of the British Army
Barracks in England
Buildings and structures in Leeds